"Open Up" is a song released by the Australian rock band Cog in March 2003. It peaked at number 81 on the ARIA charts.

Track listing
"Open Up" – 4:05
"Open Up a Little More" – 2:36
"Moshiach" (full length) – 6:43
"Paris, Texas" (full length) – 6:13
"Open Says'a'me Remix" – 8:05

Personnel

Tracks 1 and 2
 Flynn Gower – guitar and lead vocals
 Lucius Borich – drums, vocals, samples
 Luke Gower – bass, vocals
 Produced by Cog
 Recorded and engineered by Sean Boucher
 Mixed by Dave Petrovic
 Mastered by Toby Learmont

Tracks 3 and 4
 Flynn Gower – guitar and lead vocals
 Lucius Borich – drums, bass, vocals, samples
 Produced by Cog
 Recorded by Cog, except vocals, recorded by Hamish Adam
 Mixed by "Zak" and Cog
 Mastered by Marsen Murad and Michael Macken

Track 5
 Produced and arranged by Sean Boucher and DJ SIlk
 Mixed by Dave Petrovic

Charts

References

2003 singles
Cog (band) songs